Erased Tapes Records is a London-based independent record label focusing on releasing avant-garde and experimental electronic music.

History
The record company was established by Robert Raths in early 2007 in London, with the release of Ryan Lee West's Vemeer EP under the Aparatec moniker. The label is sometimes mentioned for its strong sonic and visual aesthetic with a special focus on packaging and design, which has seen collaborations with FELD, Supermundane and Gregory Euclide Erased Tapes, until 2018 (with the release ERATP100 "1+1=X"), had the tradition of releasing a free compilation every 10 releases.

In late 2011 Erased Tapes Records opened its publishing arm Erased Tapes Music. In 2014 Erased Tapes Music launched the Meet The Composer series.

In February 2017, Erased Tapes Records opened the Erased Tapes Sound Gallery in London near Victoria Park. The space was meant to be a place where artists of all kinds could showcase their work and people could gain new appreciations of the sonic and visual arts. Raths said the gallery was created in response to hearing about so many struggling artists lacking a place to practice or perform and was very pleased with the result. The Erased Tapes Sound Gallery is now closed.

Artists
 A Winged Victory for the Sullen
 The Art Ensemble of Chicago
 Adam Bryanbaum Wiltzie
 Allred
 Anne Müller
 Bell Orchestre
 Ben Lukas Boysen
 The British Expeditionary Force
 Codes in the Clouds
 Daniel Brandt 
 Daniel Thorne
 David Allred
 Dawn of Midi
 Douglas Dare
 Greg Gives Peter Space
 Guy Andrews
 Hatis Noit 
 Högni
 Immix Ensemble
 Kevin Richard Martin
 Kiasmos
 Lubomyr Melnyk
 Masayoshi Fujita
 Michael Price
 Nils Frahm
 Ólafur Arnalds
 Oliveray
 Penguin Cafe
 Penguin Cafe Orchestra
 Peter Broderick
 Qasim Naqvi
 Rival Consoles
 Sebastian Plano
 Shards
 Woodkid
 Vessel
 World's End Girlfriend

References

External links
 
"Erased Tapes Collection II Review" , Drowned in Sound, 3 January 2010.
"Erased Tapes Collection I Review" , Drowned in Sound, 7 July 2008. 

British independent record labels
Companies based in the London Borough of Hackney
Record labels established in 2007
Electronic music record labels
Electronic dance music record labels
Alternative rock record labels
Indie rock record labels
2007 establishments in England
2007 in London